Sea Killer is an Italian anti-ship missile family. The latest development of the system is known as Marte. Marte is a sea skimming, subsonic, anti-ship missile, it carries a  semi-armour piercing warhead. It has been built in several versions, with differing guidance systems, and is suitable for launching from ships or aircraft. 

Sea Killer was initially developed during the 1960s and has been deployed by at least six countries. It was used during the Iran–Iraq War, with at least six ships being hit.

Development and design
Contraves Italiana, an Italian subsidiary of the Swiss armaments company Oerlikon Contraves, began development of a short-ranged -  - ship-based anti-ship missile system, named Nettuno in 1963. Guidance of Nettuno was by beam riding for course control, with altitude controlled automatically by an onboard radar altimeter, allowing the missile to carry out sea-skimming attacks. Command guidance was an alternative guidance method if jamming made the beam-riding method unusable. In 1965, Contraves Italiana began work on an improved missile, Vulcano, which used the same guidance system, but included a two-stage (booster + sustainer) rocket motor to give a longer range. Both missiles could be fired from a five-round trainable launcher.

Testing of Nettuno began in 1966, with a trial installation being made on the Freccia-class patrol boat Saetta of the Italian navy, with the five-round launcher replacing a Bofors 40 mm gun. Testing of Vulcano began in 1969.

In 1967, the Italian company Sistel (Sistemi Elettronici) was set up as a joint venture by five Italian companies, including Contraves Italiana, and the missile division of Contraves Italina was transferred to Sistel, along with the Nettuno and Vulcano missiles in 1969. Nettuno and Vulcano were renamed Sea Killer Mark 1 and 2 respectively for export, and these names gradually replaced the older names.

Sea Killer Mark 2 was purchased by Iran to arm its Saam class of four frigates, each of which was fitted with a single five-round launcher. No other sales of the ship-based version were made, but development of Sea Killer Mark 2 into an all-weather anti-ship missile to equip the Italian Navy's helicopters began in 1967, with the helicopter-based weapon system being named Marte.

Marte entered service with the Italian Navy in 1977, with its Sikorsky SH-3 Sea Kings being fitted with two Sea Killer Mark 2 missiles. In 1983, a new version, Marte 2, was announced, with the beam-riding guidance replaced by an active radar homing seeker based on that used by the Otomat anti-ship missile. Testing of Marte 2 started in 1984, and the missile entered service with the Italian Navy in 1987.

Fitting trials of the Marte-ER onto the NH90 helicopter, which can carry two missiles, occurred in June 2014; a larger anti-ship missile like the Exocet was rejected for integration as physically too long and heavy. 

In November 2015, a Eurofighter Typhoon was fit-tested for a fixed-wing version of the missile called the Marte-ERP, which does not feature folding fins and sheds the booster for a larger 120 kg (265 lb) warhead with penetrating and sector-blast properties; though smaller than other options like the Harpoon and RBS-15, a fighter like Eurofighter Typhoon can carry six Marte-ERPs (or four with fuel tanks) compared to two or three larger missiles.

The Marte ER completed its final test firing in November 2021. Full-scale production began in late March 2022 and it then began deliveries to its launch customer, the Qatari Emiri Navy.

Operational history
Iran's Sea Killer Mk 2 saw combat service during the Iran–Iraq War, being used to attack merchant shipping in the Persian Gulf, with at least six ships being hit.

Variants
Sea Killer Mark 1
 Short-range beam riding ship-launched anti-ship missile. 10 km range,  warhead. Also designated Nettuno.
Sea Killer Mark 2
 Increased range beam-riding ship-launched anti-ship missile with improved two stage rocket. 25+ km range,  warhead. Also designated Vulcano.
Marte Mark 1
Helicopter launched beam riding anti-ship missile, based on Sea Killer Mark 2.
Marte Mark 2
Improved version of Marte, with active radar homing seeker in bulged nose.
Marte MK2/S
"Short" version of Marte 2 enabling simpler on-board integration onto helicopters.
Marte MK2/A
Modified version of Marte 2 for launch from fixed wing aircraft, with booster rocket omitted.
Marte MK2/N
Version of Marte 2 as a surface-to-surface naval missile system for littoral operations.
Marte ER
Marte ER is a sea-skimming, high subsonic anti-ship and land attack missile. Turbojet engine Williams WR WJ-24-8G extends range to over 100 km, total weight of 340 kilograms, first tested in 9 November 2018. The missile is fire-and-forget capable  and designed to operates in all weather conditions. The Eurofighter Typhoon can carries up to 6 Marte ER anti-ship missiles. 
Mobile Coastal Defence System (MCDS)
 Land based system for coastal defence. The system has the capability to launch both Marte MK2/N and / or Marte ER missile. The system needs midcourse guidance to use the maximum range of Marte ER.

Operators

 160	Sea Killer/Marte Mk 2 Vulcano, delivered between 1971-1972 for Saam frigates

 Sea Killer Mk 1 Nettuno (evaluation).
 450 Marte Mk 1 delivered since 1977 for use on SH-3D helicopters
 180 Marte Mk 2, delivered since 1987 for use on SH-3D helicopters
 39 Marte Mk 2/S delivered since 2007 for use on AW-101 & SH-90 helicopters

 Marte ER, MOU signed 30 March 2016 for coastal defence system
 (50) Marte ER in 2018 deal for NH-90 NFH helicopters

 Marte Mk2/N for use on 3 OPV58S OPV

 (25)	Sea Killer/Marte Mk2/N at least 25 delivered for Dearsan 33m FAC

 100	Marte Mk2/N, February 2009 order, delivered in 2013 for 12 Ghannatha class Fast Patrol Boats 
 (50)  Marte Mk2/N order in February 2017, for 93,6 million dollars, delivered in 2018/2019 for 12 Ghannatha class Fast Patrol Boats

 100	Sea Killer/Marte Mk1 delivered between 1980-1982 for AB-212ASW helicopters

See also
Gabriel (missile)
Sea Skua
Teseo
Exocet
AS.34 Kormoran
Penguin
Uran

References

Notes

Bibliography 

 Friedman, Norman. The Naval Institute Guide to World Naval Weapons Systems 1997–98. Annapolis, Naval Institute Press, 1997. .
 Gunston, Bill. An Illustrated Guide to Modern Airborne Missiles. London: Salamander Books, 1983. .
 Moore, John. Jane's Fighting Ships 1979–80. London: Jane's Yearbooks, 1979. .
 Pretty, Ronald T. and D.H.R Archer. Jane's Weapon Systems 1972–73. London: Sampson Low, Marston & Co, 1972. .
 Pretty, Ronald T. Jane's Weapon Systems 1977. London: Jane's Yearbooks, 1977. .
 Richardson, Doug. "World Missile Directory". Flight International, 1 October 1988, pp. 33–71.
 "Weapons Notes: Sistel produces wide range of missiles". Flight International, 25 January 1973, pp. 135–137.

External links

Anti-ship missiles of Italy
Military equipment introduced in the 1970s